The first election following the 2007 municipal reform, led to the Conservatives winning the mayor's position. However they lost it after the 2013 election, where Jørgen Otto Jørgensen from the Social Democrats took over. In the previous election, Ole Wej Petersen from the Social Democrats had won the mayor's position, after Jørgen Otto Jørgensen didn't stand for re-election.  Once again,  the Social Democrats would stand with a new candidate. This would be Peter Hansted.

In the result, the Social Democrats would once again become the biggest party, with just 17 votes more than Ærø Plus, who came second. 8 of the 9 parties that stood to be elected, would win representation. Venstre would only win 9.5% of the vote, the second lowest of any municipality in the Funen constituency. Local parties would win 5 of the 15 seats, an increase of 3 compared to 2017. The traditional red bloc and the traditional blue bloc would win 5 seats each, and therefore there was no clear winner. This also meant that a traditional red or blue majority was not possible. In the end Peter Hansted would become the mayor, as a broad agreement between the Social Democrats, the Conservatives, the Green Left, Venstre and Ærø Plus was agreed on.

Electoral system
For elections to Danish municipalities, a number varying from 9 to 31 are chosen to be elected to the municipal council. The seats are then allocated using the D'Hondt method and a closed list proportional representation.
Ærø Municipality had 15 seats in 2021

Unlike in Danish General Elections, in elections to municipal councils, electoral alliances are allowed.

Electoral alliances 

Electoral Alliance 1

Electoral Alliance 2

Results

Notes

References 

Ærø